Jagal is a village in District Gujrat, in Punjab, Pakistan, situated about  east of Kotla Arab Ali Khan. The word Jagal comes from subcast of Gujjar. They are the people who started to live here more or less in 15th century

Picture gallery 

Populated places in Gujrat District